A low island is an island of coral origin.

Low Island may refer to:
 Low Island, British Columbia, Canada
 Low Island, Falkland Islands
 Low Island, Manitoba, Canada
 Low Island, Nova Scotia, Canada
 Low Island (Nunavut), Frobisher Bay, Canada
 Low Island (Nunavut), Milne Inlet, Canada
 Low Island, Kenora, Ontario, Canada
 Low Island, Manitoulin, Ontario, Canada
 Low Island (Queensland) also known as Low Isle, one of the Low Isles
 Low Island (South Shetland Islands)
 Low Island (Washington), one of the San Juan Islands
 Inishloe, County Clare, Ireland

Low Islands may refer to:
 Low Islands, Newfoundland and Labrador, Canada
 Low Islands, Nunavut, Canada

Low Islets may refer to:
 Low Islets (Tasmania)
 Low Islets (Prime Seal Group), Tasmania

Other Low Islands:
 A. P. Low Island, Nunavut, Canada
 Bennets Low Island, Newfoundland and Labrador, Canada
 Low Duck Island, New Brunswick, Canada
 Low Shoal Island, Ontario, Canada
 South Low Island, British Columbia, Canada

May also refer to:
 Low Island (band), an English electropop band